The 1974 New Mexico gubernatorial election took place on November 5, 1974, in order to elect the Governor of New Mexico. Due to term limits, incumbent Democrat Bruce King was ineligible to seek a second term as governor.

Democratic primary
The Democratic primary was won by state senator Jerry Apodaca.

Results

Republican primary
The Republican primary was won by former state senator Joe Skeen.

Results

General election

Results

References

1974
gubernatorial
New Mexico
November 1974 events in the United States